Cletus W. Blakeman (born June 23, 1964) is an American football official in the National Football League (NFL). His uniform number is 34. He played college football at the University of Nebraska–Lincoln. Outside of his work as an NFL official, he is a partner and personal injury attorney in the law firm of Carlson Blakeman LLP in Omaha, Nebraska.

Blakeman began his American football officiating career in the Big 12 Conference, moving to the NFL in 2008 as a field judge for the first two seasons of his pro football officiating career, and subsequently refereeing for the 2010 NFL season, after Don Carey returned to the back judge position.

Selected in 2013 as the alternate referee for Super Bowl XLVIII, Blakeman officiated Super Bowl 50 in 2016.

College football career
Blakeman attended the University of Nebraska from 1984 to 1987, serving primarily as a backup quarterback for the Nebraska Cornhuskers, including the 1986 and 1987 seasons behind starter Steve Taylor.

During Nebraska's game against the unranked Colorado Buffaloes on October 25, 1986, head coach Tom Osborne replaced Taylor with Blakeman in the fourth quarter. Colorado still limited Blakeman to 4 out of 6 completions for 37 yards, and held on to upset the Huskers, 20–10, their first win over Nebraska since 1967 and the Buffaloes' first win over Nebraska at home since 1960.

Blakeman played in the 1987 Sugar Bowl, a 30–15 victory over Southeastern Conference champion LSU.

On October 3, 1987, South Carolina was leading Nebraska, 21–13, when Taylor left the game after injuring his shoulder on the last play of the 3rd quarter. In relief, Blakeman completed his only pass for 8 yards. But aided by a strong running game, and Nebraska's Blackshirts defense that forced two turnovers and allowed only 9 yards in the 4th quarter, the Huskers rallied around Blakeman to score 17 unanswered points to win, 30–21.

Blakeman also started two games in place of an injured Taylor, both of which were victories over the Kansas Jayhawks. On November 15, 1986, he threw three touchdown passes and ran for another as he led Nebraska to a 70–0 rout, the worst defeat in Jayhawk history and the biggest shutout by Nebraska up to that point. And on October 10, 1987, Blakeman completed 10-of-12 passes for 100 yards and a touchdown in Nebraska's 54–2 victory over Kansas.

Statistics

Officiating career
Blakeman was hired by the NFL for the 2008 season.  He served as field judge for the crew led by referee Bill Leavy from 2008–2009.  Blakeman received a postseason assignment in a 2009 AFC wild card game. He was then promoted to referee for the 2010 season.

Since becoming a referee, Blakeman has been assigned to nine postseason games, which include three conference championship games and Super Bowl 50.

Since 2013, Blakeman's voice and likeness have been used for penalty announcements in the Madden NFL franchise.

2022 Crew 

 R: Clete Blakeman
 U: Tab Slaughter
 DJ: Dana McKenzie
 LJ: Julian Mapp
 FJ: Terry Brown
 SJ: Lo Van Pham
 BJ: Perry Paganelli
 RO: Chad Adams
 RA: Ken Hall

References

1964 births
Living people
National Football League officials
Nebraska Cornhuskers football players
People from Blair, Nebraska
American football quarterbacks